J.P.Seaton (born 1941) is an American educator and translator. He is a Professor Emeritus of Chinese and Asian studies at the University of North Carolina at Chapel Hill and is well known as a translator of classical Chinese poetry. His translations have been widely anthologized.

The University of North Carolina at Chapel Hill Curriculum in Asian Studies and the Curriculum in Comparative Studies, along with the Ackland Art Museum, the Carolina Asia Center, the Japan Foundation, and a number of other sponsors, presented a campus-wide series of events in November 2003 on “The Aesthetics of Nirvana: Truth, Beauty and Enlightenment in Japanese Buddhism.” in honor of his career at the university.

See also Seaton’s books held in WorldCat libraries.

Additionally, selections of Seaton’s translations have been issued in special editions by Longhouse Press including “Thirty Years to Instant Enlightenment”.

As an advisory editor of The Literary Review, published by Fairleigh Dickinson University, for many years, Seaton edited a large selection of Chinese poetry in translation in 1989, and another selection in the Review in a later issue, Nine Chapbooks, Summer 2008, Vol. 51, No. 4.

Books

References 

1941 births
Living people
University of North Carolina at Chapel Hill faculty
Indiana University alumni